Provincial road N335 is a Dutch provincial road.

See also

References

External links

335
335